The 2014 NACAM Rally Championship was the seventh season of the NACAM Rally Championship. This championship was the FIA regional rally championship for the North America and Central America (NACAM) region. The season began 28 March 2014 in Oaxaca, Mexico, and ended 23 November 2014 in Jamaica, after seven events. Mid-season events, the Venezuelan Rally Isla de Margarita and new rally Rally Guyana were removed from the calendar and replaced by two additional Colombian events, Rally Guane and Rally Volcan Peña Azul.

Reigning champion Ricardo Triviño of Mexico won his fifth championship after winning Rally Guane. Trivino won the Rally Costa del Pacifico as well as Rally Guane and was the leading championship-registered competitor in two other events and second in the remaining rally, giving him an unassailable 63-point lead with two rallies left in the calendar. Trivino won the Rally Volcan Peña Azul as well, and ultimately won the championship by 86 points ahead of Nicolas Bedoya. The only driver to defeat Triviño, Francisco Name Jr., finished third in the championship, two points adrift of Bedoya; he beat Dante Pescetto for the position on a tie-break. Rally Jamaica was not contested by any of the championship regulars, with the event won by Kyle Gregg.

Event calendar and results
The 2014 NACAM Rally Championship was as follows:

Championship standings
The 2014 NACAM Rally Championship points were as follows:

References

External links

NACAM Rally Championship
NACAM
NACAM Rally Championship
NACAM Rally Championship